Internationales Pfingstturnier Wiesbaden (International Pentecost Tournament Wiesbaden) is an international horse show which is held annually at the Schlosspark Biebrich in Wiesbaden, on the Pentecost weekend. The competition dates back to 1929. It is run by the Wiesbadener Reit- und Fahr-Club (WRFC), and has tournaments in dressage, show jumping,  eventing and vaulting. In 2019, the event was officially named Longines PfingstTurnier Wiesbaden.

History 
Internationales Pfingstturnier Wiesbaden, a horse show at Schlosspark Biebrich in Wiesbaden, dates back to 1929. It is run by the Wiesbadener Reit- und Fahr-Club (WRFC). In the beginning, it was held at different locations. After World War II,  suggested to use the Schlosspark Biebrich, and the first Pfingstturnier there was held in 1949. The event has traditionally been sponsored by the Dyckerhoff family. Competitions are held in dressage, show jumping, eventing and vaulting. 

In 2019, the event was renamed Longines PfingstTurnier Wiesbaden, to honour a new main sponsor Longines. In 2020 and 2021, the event had to be cancelled due to the restrictions in the COVID-19 pandemic.

Categories

Grand Prix Spécial 

The  is the most important dressage competition of the Pfingstturnier. It is scheduled on Sunday afternoon, with prize money of 26,000 Euro as of 2018.

Winners (from 1989):

Jumping

Großer Preis von Wiesbaden 

The jumping competition Großer Preis von Wiesbaden has been held from 1958 and is the most important show jumping event with the highest prize money. In the years 2012 and 2013, it was named Preis der Landeshauptstadt Wiesbaden. It is regularly held as the conclusion of the event. In the first year, the prize money was 10.000 DM, and in 2018 it was 150,000 Euro.

Winners from 1958 to 2012 have included:

References

External links 

 
 Wiesbadener Reit- und Fahr-Club (in German)
 Watschounek, Volker: Das Wiesbadener Pfingstturnier wird doch abgesagt (in German) Wiesbaden lebt 14 April 2021

Equestrian sports competitions in Germany
Sport in Wiesbaden
Show jumping events
Dressage events
Wiesbaden